Aladdin is a crater in the northern hemisphere of Saturn's moon Enceladus.  Aladdin was first discovered in Voyager 2 images.  It is located at 60.7° North Latitude, 26.7° West Longitude and is 37.4 kilometers across.  It is located near the craters Ali Baba and Samad.  Aladdin has a large dome in its interior, suggesting the crater has undergone some viscous relaxation.

Aladdin is named after a famous hero from Arabian Nights who finds a magic lamp.

References

Impact craters on Enceladus